The Coppa Sabatini is a late season road bicycle race held annually in Province of Pisa, Italy. From 2005 to 2019, the race was organised as a 1.1 event on the UCI Europe Tour. In 2020, it was added to the UCI ProSeries, upgrading its classification to 1.Pro.

Winners
Source:

References

External links
Official site 

UCI Europe Tour races
Cycle races in Italy
Recurring sporting events established in 1952
1952 establishments in Italy
Sport in Tuscany